is a Japanese footballer currently playing as a defender for Oita Trinita.

Career statistics

Club
.

Notes

References

1999 births
Living people
People from Toyota, Aichi
Association football people from Aichi Prefecture
Aichi Gakuin University alumni
Japanese footballers
Japan youth international footballers
Association football defenders
J3 League players
FC Imabari players